The 2016–17 Little Rock Trojans women's basketball team represented the University of Arkansas at Little Rock during the 2016–17 NCAA Division I women's basketball season. The Trojans, led by fourteenth year head coach Joe Foley, played their home games at the Jack Stephens Center and were members of the Sun Belt Conference. They finished the season 25–9, 17–1 in Sun Belt play to win the Sun Belt regular season title. They advanced to the semifinals of the Sun Belt women's tournament where they lost to Louisiana–Lafayette. They received an automatic bid to the WNIT where defeated Southern Miss in the first round before losing to Alabama in the second round.

Roster

Schedule

 
|-
!colspan=9 style="background:#800000; color:white;"| Non-conference regular season

|-
!colspan=9 style="background:#800000; color:white;"| Sun Belt Conference regular season

|-
!colspan=9 style="background:#800000; color:white;"| Sun Belt Women's Tournament

|-
!colspan=9 style="background:#800000;"| WNIT

Rankings

See also
 2016–17 Little Rock Trojans men's basketball team

References

Little Rock Trojans women's basketball seasons
Little Rock
2017 Women's National Invitation Tournament participants